{{DISPLAYTITLE:2014 AF5}}

 (also written 2014 AF5) is an Apollo near-Earth asteroid roughly 5–10 meters in diameter that passed less than 1 lunar distance from Earth on 1 January 2014.

Description 
From mid November 2013 until 1 January 2014 15:00 UT the small dim asteroid had an elongation less than 45 degrees from the Sun with an undetectable apparent magnitude of around 30. While less than 18 degrees from the Sun any dim asteroid can be lost in astronomical twilight. On 1 January 2014 10:00 UT the asteroid passed  from the Moon and at 16:13 UT passed  from Earth. The asteroid was then discovered on 2 January 2014 by the Catalina Sky Survey at an apparent magnitude of 18.9 using a  Schmidt–Cassegrain telescope. By 3 January 2014 the asteroid was becoming dimmer than apparent magnitude 20.

See also 
List of asteroid close approaches to Earth in 2014

References

External links 
 
 
 

Minor planet object articles (unnumbered)

Discoveries by the Catalina Sky Survey
20140101
20140102